Acrocercops clinogramma is a moth of the family Gracillariidae, known from Vietnam. It was described by Edward Meyrick in 1930.

References

clinogramma
Moths of Asia
Moths described in 1930